Bärbel Podeswa (née Weidlich; born 8 December 1946 in Naumburg) is a retired East German hurdler.

She won the silver medal in 50 m hurdles at the 1968 European Indoor Games, behind Karin Balzer. At the 1969 European Championships she won a silver medal in the 100 m hurdles as well as a gold medal in 4x100 metres relay, together with teammates Renate Meißner, Regina Höfer and Petra Vogt.

She competed for the club SC Chemie Halle during her active career.

1946 births
Living people
East German female hurdlers
SC Chemie Halle athletes
European Athletics Championships medalists
Universiade medalists in athletics (track and field)
People from Naumburg (Saale)
Universiade silver medalists for East Germany
Medalists at the 1970 Summer Universiade
Sportspeople from Saxony-Anhalt